Castilleja caudata, common name Port Clarence Indian paintbrush or pale Indian paintbrush, is a plant species native to Alaska, Yukon, Northwest Territories, Nunavut, and the northeastern part of Asiatic Russia. The first common name refers to Port Clarence, on the north coast of the Bering Sea just south of Nome.

Castilleja caudata is an herb with a short taproot. The plant appears to be a facultative parasite, capable of surviving without draining nutrients from other plants but growing more healthy if it can draw sustenance from other plants. Stems can reach a height of 40 cm (16 inches). Leaves and stems tend to be hairless toward the bottom, finely hairy above, and bristly in the inflorescence. Leaves are narrowly lanceolate, tapering gradually toward the tip. The inflorescence has 5-12 flowers, the flowers greenish-yellow each with a greenish-yellow to cream-colored bract below.

References

Castilleja
Flora of Russia
Flora of Alaska
Flora of Yukon
Flora of the Northwest Territories
Flora of Nunavut
Flora without expected TNC conservation status